State Trunk Highway 45 (often called Highway 45, STH-45 or WIS 45) was a number assigned to two different state highways in the U.S. state of Wisconsin:
Highway 45 from 1917 to 1923, along the current route of U.S. Highway 63 from Red Wing, Minnesota to Ellsworth, WIS 65 and WIS 35 up to Hudson
Highway 45 from 1923 to 1934, currently routed as Highway 34
For the highway in Wisconsin numbered 45 since 1934, see U.S. Highway 45.

45